A roller coaster train is a vehicle made up of two or more cars connected by specialized joints which transports passengers around a roller coaster's circuit. Roller coasters usually have various safety features, including specialized wheels and restraints.

Description 
A roller coaster train is a vehicle made up of two or more cars connected by specialized joints which transports passengers around a roller coaster's circuit. It is called a train because the cars follow one another around the track, the same reason as for a railroad train. Individual cars vary in design and can carry from one to eight or more passengers each.

Operation 
Many roller coasters operate more than one train, sometimes several, simultaneously. Typically they operate two trains at a time, with one train loading and unloading while the other train runs the course. On the Rock 'n' Roller Coaster at Walt Disney World, for example, there are five trains, but only four operate at a time (the trains are rotated out on a regular basis for safety reasons).

Basic safety features

Wheels

Roller coaster trains have wheels that run on the sides (side friction or guide wheels) and underneath the track (upstop, underfriction, or underlocking wheels) as well as on top of it (road or running wheels); these lock the train to the tracks and prevent it from jumping the track. The side wheels can be mounted on the outside or inside of the train, depending on the manufacturer (although outside-mounted wheels are more common). The wheels are sometimes located between the cars, as well as at the front and rear of the entire train.

Restraints

Roller coaster trains also have restraints that keep the passengers in their seats. There are two major types of restraints: lap bar and over-the-shoulder. (Most modern over-the-shoulder restraints come into contact with riders at the lap; however, older so-called "horsecollar" ones actually restrain riders by the shoulders). Restraints always use two locking mechanisms, one on each side, for redundancy. If one fails, the restraint will remain locked. Most modern roller coasters also have seat belts that may act as secondary safety devices. On over-the-shoulder restraints, this seatbelt is mostly cosmetic as the restraint locks on its own.

Lap bars were first used in 1907 with the Coney Island coaster Drop the Dip. Lap bar restraints consist of a padded bar mounted to the floor or side of the train that swings backwards into the rider's lap. These restraints are usually found on roller coasters that lack inversions. Some inverting roller coasters, notably ones created by Anton Schwarzkopf safely operate without the need for shoulder restraints. Historically, inverting roller coasters with lap bars could only perform vertical loops, as the higher centripetal force (and low lateral force) exerted while traversing a simple clothoid loop helps to keep riders safely in the train. However, with modern advances in engineering, more roller coasters with complicated inversions are able to run without over-the-shoulder restraints. For example, most of Premier Rides' LIM-launched roller coasters (the vast majority of which have multiple inverting elements) operate with only lap bars. Lap bar restraints, like buzz bars give the rider much greater freedom of movement than over-the-shoulder restraints, enhancing the feeling of danger for some.

Over-the-shoulder restraints, the most common type, consist of a roughly U-shaped padded bar mounted to the top of each seat that swings downward. Roller coasters that have inversions usually have this type of restraint. Additionally, almost all inverted and floorless roller coasters have this type of restraint, since it is difficult to mount a lap bar restraint. One disadvantage of over-the-shoulder restraints is that they can provide discomfort to the rider (known among coaster enthusiasts as headbanging), especially on rougher roller coasters. It is recommended that earrings should be removed before riding roller coasters with over-the-shoulder restraints. Some rides, such as Maverick at Cedar Point, require that guests must remove earrings before riding.

However, there are some operating roller coasters that do not have either restraint systems. Rollo Coaster at Idlewild and Soakzone is a good example of this. Usually roller coasters with little to no air-time (being lifted out of your seat) do not have restraints. Until early 2006, The Rollercoaster at Blackpool Pleasure Beach in the UK also operated without any restraints, although seatbelts were added to the ride in the 2007 season. During 2008, trains from the Big Dipper Rollercoaster were installed on the ride. "The Rollercoaster" now operates with lap bars, although the original train is still stored on the transfer track in the station.

References

Roller coaster elements
Trains